The West Midlands Metro is a light-rail/tram line in the West Midlands of England operating between Birmingham and Wolverhampton via West Bromwich and Wednesbury. It is owned and operated by Transport for West Midlands.

It opened on 30 May 1999, mostly using the former disused Birmingham Snow Hill to Wolverhampton Low Level Line. An extension into Birmingham City Centre was approved in 2012, and is now partially operational.

Existing stops

Line 1

References

Midland Metro Stations
West Midlands Metro
Midland Metro